Infinity is the debut album by English acid house musician Guru Josh, released in the UK in July 1990 by Deconstruction Records. The album features the single "Infinity" which was released in December 1989 and reached number five on the UK Singles Chart on 24 February 1990.

Release
The album was released on vinyl, cassette and CD in July 1990 in the United Kingdom, Spain and Europe. It was later released in Japan on 21 September 1990 by BMG Victor Inc. On 19 June 2004, the album was re-released in the UK on CD by Sony Music with five exclusive bonus tracks.

Track listing

Charts

References

External links 
 
  - Guru Josh Project – Infinity 2008

1990 debut albums
Guru Josh albums
Acid house albums
Techno albums by British artists
Bertelsmann Music Group albums